Hans Christian Ørsted (1777–1851) was a Danish physicist.

Ørsted, Orsted or Oersted may also refer to:

People
Anders Sandøe Ørsted (1778–1860), Danish politician and jurist, brother of Hans Christian Ørsted
Anders Sandøe Ørsted (botanist) (1816–1872), Danish botanist, mycologist, zoologist and marine biologist
Niels-Henning Ørsted Pedersen (1946–2005), Danish musician
Hans-Henrik Ørsted (born 1954), Danish track cyclist
MØ, professional name of Karen Marie Ørsted (born 1988), musician

Other uses
Oersted, the CGS unit of magnetic field strength
Ørsted (company), a Danish power company
Oersted (crater), on the Moon
Ørsted (satellite), the first Danish satellite launched into orbit
Oersted Medal, recognizes notable contributions to the teaching of physics
Oersted, a character in 1994 role-playing video game Live A Live

See also 
Ølsted (disambiguation), several inhabited places in Denmark